, is a Japanese musician and composer, best known for his collaborations with Chisato Moritaka from 1987 to 1995. He is also the producer of the musical cat group Musashi's.

Career 
After graduating from Keio University, Saitō formed the band "You" in 1980 before pursuing a career as a music producer. Since his work on Chisato Moritaka's debut album New Season, he has composed more than 60 songs for her. He has also played guitar in over 1,000 recordings for different artists. In 1993, Saitō became the first Japanese composer to release songs in South Korea.

Saitō served as a judge in the NTV talent show  from 2005 to 2010. There, he discovered Koji Higashino on the March 3, 2010 episode. In June 2010, Saitō joined keyboardist Minoru Mukaiya and vocalist Keizo Nakanishi in the band  as guitarist and producer. In November 2013, Saitō produced the song "Voice", which was recorded by 23 musicians in 14 countries to support the victims of the 2011 Tōhoku earthquake and tsunami.

Notable artists

As a composer 
Mami Ayukawa

Cute
 "Kono Machi"

D-51

Yui Kano

Noriko Katō
 "Kondo Watashi Doko ka Tsurete itte Kudasai yo"

KinKi Kids
 "Tabiji ~You're My Buddy~"

Mei Kurokawa

Hiroko Moriguchi

Chisato Moritaka

Miho Nakayama
 "Megamitachi no Bōken"

Rimi Natsukawa

Reiko Ōmori

Ken'ya Ōsumi

Pistol Valve

Hekiru Shiina
 "Koi"
 "Ride a Wave"

Kiyotaka Sugiyama

Tokio
 "Spicy Girl"

Yuki Uchida

Wink
 "Tasty"

As a musician 
 Steffanie Borges
 Joe Hisaishi
 Masahiko Kondō
 Yoko Minamino
 Hibari Misora
 Rie Miyazawa
 Miho Morikawa
 Miyuki Nakajima
 Akina Nakamori
 Yōko Oginome
 Ribbon
 Kenji Sawada
 Shonentai
 Keiko Terada
 Takuro Yoshida

Awards and nominations

References

External links 
 

1958 births
Living people
Japanese composers
Japanese male composers
Keio University alumni
Musicians from Tokyo